The 2007–08 Austin Peay Governors basketball team represented Austin Peay State University during the 2007–08 NCAA Division I men's basketball season. The Governors, led by 18th year head coach Dave Loos, played their home games at the Dunn Center and were members of the West Division of the Ohio Valley Conference. They finished the season 24–11, 16–4 in OVC play. They won the OVC tournament to earn the conference's automatic bid to the NCAA tournament. As the No. 15 seed in the South region, they lost to Texas in the first round.

Roster

Schedule and results 

|-
!colspan=9 style=| Regular season

|-
!colspan=9 style=|Ohio Valley Conference tournament

|-
!colspan=9 style=|NCAA tournament

References 

Austin Peay Governors men's basketball seasons
Austin Peay
Austin Peay
Austin Peay
Austin Peay